Mark Edward Allbrook (born 15 November 1954) is an English former first-class cricketer and school headmaster.

Allbrook was educated at Tonbridge School and Trinity Hall, Cambridge, where he read classics. He played for Cambridge University Cricket Club from 1975 to 1978, the Combined Universities in 1978 and in 12 matches for Nottinghamshire County Cricket Club from 1976 to 1980. He also played in one 'youth' test match for England Young Cricketers in 1974 and for the Kent Second  XI in 1974 and 1975. He was an off-break bowler and right-handed tail order batsman. He took 5 wickets in an innings on 2 occasions, with a best of 7 for 79 for Cambridge against Nottinghamshire.

Allbrook was a housemaster at Hurstpierpoint College 1980–94, deputy headmaster at Felsted School 1994–2002, and headmaster of Bloxham School 2002–13. In 2015 he became chairman of the Norwich Diocesan Board of Education.

References

English cricketers
Nottinghamshire cricketers
1954 births
Living people
Cricketers from Frimley
Cambridge University cricketers
People educated at Tonbridge School
Alumni of Trinity Hall, Cambridge
British Universities cricketers
Headmasters of Bloxham School